Qarah Aqachli (also Romanized as Qarah Āqāchlī; also known as Qarah Qāshlī) is a village in Maraveh Tappeh Rural District, in the Central District of Maraveh Tappeh County, Golestan Province, Iran. At the 2006 census, its population was 202, in 44 families.

References 

Populated places in Maraveh Tappeh County